Trinity Church may refer to:

Antarctica
Trinity Church (Antarctica)

Australia
Holy Trinity Church, Adelaide, originally named Trinity Church
Trinity Church, Perth

Bulgaria 
 Trinity Church, Bansko

Canada
 Little Trinity Anglican Church
 Trinity Anglican Church (Cambridge, Ontario)
 Trinity Anglican Church (Ottawa)
 Trinity Evangelical Lutheran Church (Toronto)
 Trinity-St. Paul's United Church
 Trinity-St. Stephen's United Church
 Trinity United Church (Peterborough, Ontario)

China
Trinity Church, Changsha
Trinity Church, Langzhong

Denmark
Trinitatis Church (Trinity Church), Copenhagen
Trinity Church, Esbjerg

Finland 
 Holy Trinity Church, Vaasa

France 
 Abbey of Sainte-Trinité, Caen
 Sainte-Trinité, Paris

Georgia
Gergeti Trinity Church

Germany
Propsteikirche St. Trinitatis, Leipzig

Luxembourg
 Trinity Church, Luxembourg

Norway
 Trinity Church (Arendal) (Trefoldighetskirken)
 Trinity Church (Oslo) (Trefoldighetskirken)

Russia
Trinity Church in Orekhovo-Borisovo, Moscow
Trinity Church (Novocherkassk), Rostov Oblast

Slovakia
Trinitarian Church of Bratislava (Trinity Church)

Sweden
Trinity Church, Halmstad (Trefaldighetskyrkan)
Trinity Church (Karlskrona) (Trefaldighetskyrkan)
Trinity Church, Kristianstad

Ukraine
 Gate Church of the Trinity (Pechersk Lavra), Kyiv

United Kingdom
Trinity Church, Barrow-in-Furness, Cumbria
Trinity Church (Brentwood), Essex
Trinity Cheltenham
Trinity with Palm Grove Church, Claughton, Birkenhead, Merseyside
Trinity College Kirk, now dismantled Royal Collegiate Church in Edinburgh

United States
 Trinity Church (Nevada City), California
 Trinity Church (Oakland, California)
 Trinity Church (Brooklyn, Connecticut)
 Trinity Church (Milton, Connecticut)
 Trinity Church (Thomaston, Connecticut)
 Trinity Church (Elkridge, Maryland)
 Trinity Church (Boston), Massachusetts
 Trinity Baptist Church (Concord, New Hampshire)
 Trinity Church (Cornish, New Hampshire)
 Trinity Church (Holderness, New Hampshire)
 Trinity Church (Swedesboro, New Jersey)
 Trinity Methodist Church (Beacon, New York)
 Trinity Church (Constantia, New York)
 Trinity Church (Elmira, New York)
 Trinity Chapel Complex, Manhattan
 Trinity Church (Manhattan)
 Trinity Church Complex (Roslyn, New York)
 Trinity Church (Warsaw, New York)
 Trinity Methodist Church (Elizabethtown, North Carolina)
 Trinity Episcopal Church (Scotland Neck, North Carolina)
 Nast Trinity United Methodist Church, Cincinnati, Ohio
 Old Trinity Church, Philadelphia, Pennsylvania
 Trinity Church (Newport, Rhode Island)
 Trinity Church (Pawtucket, Rhode Island)
 Trinity Church (Mason, Tennessee)
 Trinity Episcopal Church (Houston), Texas
 Trinity Church (Beaverdam, Virginia)

See also
Church of the Holy Trinity v. United States, a decision of the Supreme Court of the United States
Church of the Life-Giving Trinity (disambiguation)
Dreifaltigkeitskirche (disambiguation)
Holy Trinity Church (disambiguation)
Trinity Church and Rectory (disambiguation)
Trinity Episcopal Church (disambiguation)
Trinity Methodist Church (disambiguation)
Trinity Methodist Episcopal Church (disambiguation)